"The Great Rock Island Route", popularized as "Wabash Cannonball" and various other titles, is a 19th-century American folk song that describes the scenic beauty and predicaments of a fictional train, the Wabash Cannonball Express, as it traveled on the Great Rock Island Railroad. The song has become a country music staple and common marching band repertoire. The only train to actually bear the name was created in response to the song's popularity, with the Wabash Railroad renaming its daytime express service between Detroit and St. Louis as the Wabash Cannon Ball from 1949 until discontinuation during the formation of Amtrak in 1971. 

The Carter Family made one of the first recordings of the song in 1929, though it was not released until 1932. Another popular version was recorded by Roy Acuff in 1936. The Acuff version is one of the fewer than 40 all-time singles to have sold 10 million (or more) physical copies worldwide.

It is a signature song of the Indiana State University Marching Sycamores and the Purdue All-American Marching Band as the ISU and Purdue campuses are adjacent to the Mighty Wabash River. It is also associated with the Stephen F. Austin State University Lumberjack Marching Band, the Kansas State University Marching Band, the Texas Tech University Goin' Band from Raiderland, and the University of Texas Longhorn Band.

 It is the oldest song on the list.

History

In addition to the Carter Family's 1929 recording and Roy Acuff's 1936 recording, many hillbilly artists recorded "The Wabash Cannonball" during the Great Depression era of the 1930s and the song was also recorded by Piedmont Blues legend Blind Willie McTell. Bing Crosby recorded the song for his album Bing Crosby Sings The Great Country Hits. The song increased in popularity during this time.

Origins
There are many theories of the origin of "The Wabash Cannonball". Utah Phillips states that hobos imagined a mythical train called the "Wabash Cannonball" which was a "death coach" that appeared at the death of a hobo to carry his soul to its reward. The song was then created with the lyrics and music telling the story of the train. When the hobos learned of this train, they called her the "Wabash Cannonball" and said that every station in America had heard her whistle.
Another story states that the song is based on a tall tale in which Cal S. Bunyan, Paul Bunyan's brother, constructed a railroad known as the Ireland, Jerusalem, Australian & Southern Michigan Line. After two months of service, the 700-car train was traveling so fast that it arrived at its destination an hour before its departure. Finally, the train took off so fast that it rushed into outer space and where, for all that is known, it is still traveling.

Lyrics
Over many years, this popular song's music has remained unchanged while the verses have been updated by song artists. As early as 1882, sheet music titled "The Great Rock Island Route" was credited to J. A. Roff. This version and all subsequent versions contain a variation of this chorus:

A rewritten version by William Kindt appeared in 1904 under the title "Wabash Cannon Ball".

Namesakes
In the wake of the song's popularity, the Wabash Railroad renamed its daytime express run between Detroit and St. Louis as the Wabash Cannon Ball in 1949, the only actual train to bear the name, which it carried until the creation of Amtrak in 1971, when it was discontinued. However, the train was named after the song, not the other way around. On October 26 and 27, 2013, Fort Wayne Railroad Historical Society's Nickel Plate Road 765, in conjunction with the Norfolk Southern Railway's "21st Century Steam" program, pulled a 225-mile round-trip excursion, retracing the Cannon Ball's former route between Fort Wayne and Lafayette, Indiana.
A roller coaster at the now-defunct Opryland USA theme park was titled after the song as well.  It was operated from 1975 to 1997.  In 1998, after Opryland's closing, the double cork-screw coaster was relocated to Old Indiana Fun-n-Water Park in Thorntown, Indiana.  In 2003, it was moved into storage.

Use in collegiate sports
"The Wabash Cannonball" (arranged by Joel Leach) is known as the unofficial "second" fight song of Kansas State University, having been played since the late 1960s.  It was the only piece of sheet music rescued from the KSU music department in the Nichols Hall fire of 1968, and grew in popularity with students and fans.  The Kansas State University Marching Band says that "the Wabash Cannonball has come to represent the survival of the underdog in the hearts and minds of all true K-State fans, and has earned a secure place in the KSUMB's history and traditions." Currently Kansas State is the prime contributing player of the song and most noted with Big 12 fans and spectators.

The University of Texas Longhorn Band plays the song at the beginning of every fourth quarter during football season.  The tradition began when Texas was in the Southwest Conference and Kansas State University was in the Big 8 Conference. Texas band director Vincent R. DiNino once asked football coach Darrell K. Royal if he had any songs he would like to hear the Longhorn Band play.  His response was that they did not play enough country music and that he would like to hear Wabash Cannonball. Band rivalry has developed since both schools joined the Big 12 Conference.

At Stephen F. Austin State University, the Twirl-O-Jacks traditionally perform to the tune as played by the Lumberjack Marching Band at the beginning of each football game. The band has also been known to play excerpts from the song during various sporting events.

Other recordings
Woody Guthrie, as the Dustbowl Balladeer, adapted the song for his "Grand Coulee Dam", one of several songs he wrote about the largest concrete structure in the U.S. He also composed another song, "Farmer-Labor Train", with the same melody.  On August 29, 1942, he performed "The Farmer-Labor Train" on the AFL- and CIO-sponsored 15-minute weekly radio show "Labor for Victory" on NBC Radio.  In 1948, he transformed the "Wabash Cannonball" again into "The Wallace-Taylor Train" for the 1948 Progressive National Convention, which nominated former U.S. Vice President Henry A. Wallace for president. Alistair Cooke noted some verses:

See also
List of train songs

References

American folk songs
Carter Family songs
Fictional trains
Roy Acuff songs
Songs about trains
United States National Recording Registry recordings
Kansas State Wildcats